ZM-182345 is a nonsteroidal progestin that was never marketed. It was derived from structural modification of the nonsteroidal antiandrogen hydroxyflutamide. ZM-182345 was found to be at least as potent as progesterone as a progestogen in animals but to also possess androgenic activity.

References

Androgens and anabolic steroids
Progestogens
Trifluoromethyl compounds